TVN International or iTVN is a Polish pay television channel that was launched on April 2004. It is part of the TVN network and is owned by Warner Bros. Discovery It is aimed at the Polish diaspora living abroad, mainly in Europe and North America. TVNi's programming consists of TV series, newscasts, Polish football matches, movies and entertainment programmes, mostly of Polish origin.

Distribution 
TVN International is available via satellite in the U.S. and Australia, cable in Germany, France, United States and Canada.

As of 30 April 2010, RCN Corporation, a cable provider that provides its services to customers in Boston, New York, Washington DC, Eastern Pennsylvania and Chicago areas, broadcasts iTVN and TVN24 channels on 485 and 486 respectively (958 and 959 in Leigh Valley).

As of July 2011, TVN International started to be carried by Cablevision in the US.

References

External links
 

International broadcasters
TVN (Polish TV channel)
Television channels in Poland
Television channels and stations established in 2004
2004 establishments in Poland